McRaven is a surname whose bearers include:

 Claude C. McRaven (1918–2007), United States Air Force colonel and football player
 William H. McRaven (born 1955), United States Navy four-star admiral (retired), former Commander of U.S. Special Operations
 Dale McRaven (1939–2022), American screenwriter and producer, creator of sitcoms Angie and Perfect Strangers

See also
McRaven House, 18th century home in Vicksburg, Mississippi